New Barbuda Development Movement is a political party in Barbuda, Antigua and Barbuda. NBDM was an offshoot of the Antigua Labour Party. The party contested the March 1997 elections to the Barbuda Council, but won no seats (Barbuda People's Movement won all seats).

 the party remained a valid party in Antigua and Barbuda.

Political parties in Antigua and Barbuda
Barbuda political parties
Political parties with year of establishment missing
Political parties with year of disestablishment missing